The World Rowing Cup is an international rowing competition organized by FISA (the International Rowing Federation). It began in 1997 and comprises three regattas (apart from in 2001 when there were four) held throughout early summer.  In each event points are awarded to the top seven finishing boats and an overall winner determined after the last world cup regatta each year.  During the regattas the current leader in each event must wear yellow bibs. The World Rowing Cup has only been staged outside Europe on 3 occasions, in 2001 Princeton and in both 2013 and 2014 Sydney.

World Cup in single scullers (1990–1995) 
From 1990 to 1995, the World Rowing Cup was a competition for single scullers. At three to six international regattas during one season, points for a total rating and cash prizes could be won. The World Rowing Federation wanted to better market its sport and increase sponsorship income through improved TV-presence. These goals were missed, which ultimately led to the termination of this form of the World Cup after the 1995 season.

Editions and stages (since 1997)

Format
The World Rowing Cup is an annual series of three regattas that act as a lead-up to the World Rowing Championships. Racing at the World Rowing Cup includes the 14 Olympic boat classes and a selection of International boat classes. Para-rowing is contested at some World Cups. Each Olympic boat class earns points based on the finishing order. The highest placing boat from a country is awarded the following points:

1st = 8 points, 2nd = 6 points, 3rd = 5 points, 4th = 4 points, 5th = 3 points, 6th = 2 points, 7th = 1 point

References

External links
 The official World Rowing
 Lucerne World Cup website 
 Munich World Cup website 

 
Rowing competitions
Recurring sporting events established in 1997
Rowing